The neglected worm lizard (Amphisbaena neglecta) is a worm lizard species in the genus Amphisbaena. It is endemic to Brazil.

Geographic range
It is found in the Central-West Region, Brazil.

Status
The species is only known from the first specimen collected and has likely been threatened by a reservoir constructed for hydroelectric power, however extensive searches have not located this species. Chapada dos Guimarães National Park is next to the reservoir so the worm lizard may be protected and also threatened.

See also
 List of reptiles of Brazil

References

neglecta
Reptiles described in 1936
Taxa named by Emmett Reid Dunn
Taxa named by Jean Piatt